Raman Parasuraman is a 1980 Indian Tamil-language film, directed by M. S. Gopinath. The film stars Sivakumar, Latha, Rathi, Sathyaraj and Pandari Bai. It was released on 19 September 1980.

Plot 

Three antique statue smugglers kill a husband and wife and let their two sons as orphans. The two brothers get separated. While the elder named Parasuraman grows as an outlaw with a strong urge to take revenge of the three who killed his parents, the younger named Ram becomes a doctor. Parasuraman goes in search of those three overseas and kills all of them. The brothers ultimately reunite.

Cast 
Sivakumar as Ram and Parasuraman
Latha
Rathi
Major Sundarrajan
Thyagarajan
Sathyaraj
Pandari Bai
P. R. Varalakshmi
Jayamalini
A. R. Srinivasan

Production 
Raman Parasuraman was filmed in Singapore, Japan and Hong Kong. A. R. Srinivasan accepted to play one of the three antagonists after the original actor backed out despite the film being nearly complete.

Soundtrack 
The songs were composed by Satyam, with lyrics by Vaali.

Reception 
Kalki appreciated the film's music, cinematography and lack of comedy.

References

External links 

1980 films
1980s Tamil-language films
Films about brothers
Films scored by Satyam (composer)
Films shot in Hong Kong
Films shot in Japan
Films shot in Singapore
Indian films about revenge